Osmodes thora, the common white-spots, is a butterfly in the family Hesperiidae. It is found in Guinea, Sierra Leone, Liberia, Ivory Coast, Ghana, Togo, Nigeria, Cameroon, the Republic of the Congo, Angola, the Central African Republic, the Democratic Republic of the Congo, southern Sudan, Uganda, western Kenya and western Tanzania. The habitat consists of forests.

References

Butterflies described in 1884
Erionotini
Butterflies of Africa